Guru is a 2017 Indian Telugu-language sports drama film written and directed by Sudha Kongara and produced by S. Shashikanth on YNOT Studios banner. The film stars Venkatesh and Ritika Singh with the music composed by Santhosh Narayanan. The film is remake of Kongara's own film Irudhi Suttru / Saala Khadoos (2016).

Plot 
Aditya alias Aadi is a failed boxer who, despite being very talented, falls victim to the dirty politics in the boxing association. Many years later, Aadi, now coaching the women's boxing teams, is extremely angry and frustrated with the partiality in selection. Due to his rift with the association head Dev Khatri, he is falsely charged with sexual harassment and transferred to Vizag. Despite the very poor infrastructure, Aadi manages to find talent in a roadside vegetable seller, Rameswari alias Ramulu, who he along with his assistant coach Punch Ponds notices while she is thrashing the judges during her sister's tournament.

Ignoring Rameswari's elder sister Lakshmi alias Lux, who has been boxing for 8 years, Aadi offers to train Rameswari for 4 hours daily. But the two don't get along due to Aadi's ruthless training methods and Rameswari's aggressive nature. As a result, Rameswari intentionally loses a local match. Aadi later asks Lakshmi and Rameswari's parents, to send them to stay in a hostel with him so their daughters can work hard on training. Rameswari misunderstands him, but later regrets it when she finds out that Aadi has sold his bike to buy new training equipment for her. Rameswari then starts training with Aadi rather intensely with dedication and develops feelings for him. On the day of a qualifying match, she reveals her feelings to Aadi, and he promptly rejects her. During the warm-up before the match Lakshmi, who is now jealous of her sister, injures Rameswari's hand causing Rameswari to lose. Aadi thinks that Rameswari lost intentionally again and throws her out of training camp.

Dev Khatri takes advantage of the situation by calling Rameswari to Delhi for a cultural exchange tournament and makes her fight with a heavyweight Russian boxer, who knocks out Rameswari in a few seconds. A demotivated Rameswari is then approached by Dev Khatri with an indecent proposal, to which she reacts by injuring him. Dev Khatri takes revenge by getting her arrested on false theft charges.

Aadi comes to the rescue and bails her out. He later takes Rameswari to Delhi to get her a wild-card entry into the World Boxing Championship. Rameswari works hard and goes on to win the semifinal. On the day of finals, Dev Khatri removes Rameswari's name from the list and asks Aadi to resign immediately if he wants to see Rameswari in the final, with the same Russian boxer who knocked her out in Delhi. Rameswari gets to fight in the final round but is dejected after learning about Aadi's resignation. She keeps losing points in the early rounds and gets badly injured before Aadi shows up at the stadium and indicates her to attack her opponent's arms to make her weak. Rameswari follows the game plan and knocks out the opponent with seconds to go in the final round. Dev Khatri quickly attempts to take the credit for training Rameswari. Still, she punches him and runs towards Aadi and hugs him, showing the emotional reunion of a coach and student.

Cast
Venkatesh as Aditya "Aadi" Rao
Ritika Singh as Rameswari "Ramulu"
Nassar as Punch Ponds
Tanikella Bharani as Murali
Zakir Hussain as Dev Khatri 
Mumtaz Sorcar as Lakshmi "Lux"
Raghu Babu as Soomulu
Anitha Chowdary as Rajyam
Ananth Babu as Boxing Association member
Sanchana Natarajan as a boxing student

Soundtrack

Music composed by Santhosh Narayanan. Music released on Lahari Music Company. Except "Jingidi", all other songs were reused from the original Tamil film's soundtrack. The song "Jingidi" marked the singing debut of actor Venkatesh.

Production  
Principal photography commenced in September 2016 in Hyderabad. Principle filmography took place in Vizag, Hyderabad, and Goa. The film has completed shooting in the first week of December 2016. While Santhosh Narayanan and Sathish Suriya was retained as music director and editor from the original version of the film, there are some changes on other technical teams. Art director Jacki was roped into the project, replacing T. Santhanam from the original adaptation.

References

External links 
 

2017 films
2010s Telugu-language films
2010s sports drama films
Indian sports drama films
Indian boxing films
Films about women's sports
Films scored by Santhosh Narayanan
Telugu remakes of Tamil films
Telugu remakes of Hindi films
Films directed by Sudha Kongara
2017 drama films